Nesthäkchen Flies From the Nest is a 1921 German-language novel written by Else Ury. It is the sixth book in Ury's ten-book Nesthäkchen series, which follows protagonist Annemarie from infancy through old age. Nesthäkchen Flies From the Nest covers Annemarie's college days, courtship, and marriage.

Plot summary

Else Ury's Nesthäkchen is a Berlin doctor's daughter, Anne Marie Braun; a slim, golden blond, quintessential German girl.

In this story, which takes place in the years 1922-1923 Annemarie goes with her girlfriends Ilse and Marlene to study in Tübingen. Annemarie wants to study medicine to be assistant to her father. Only under the condition that she then continue  her training in Berlin does he allow the academic year in Tübingen. Aunt Albertina does not agree that a young girl should leave the parental home alone.
On the outward journey Annemarie misses a train in Würzburg and loses Ilse and Marlene but meets a young doctor, Rudolf Hartenstein, who likes her immediately.
Finally arriving in Tübingen, Annemarie lives with Ilse and Marlene at the home of the couple Nepomuk and Veronika Kirchmäuser and their children Vronli and Kasper. The girls make friends with students Krabbe, Neumann and Egerling with whom they establish a "Swabian hiking covenant." Else Ury brings in here the Wandervogel movement, a motif popular at the beginning of the 20th century. At a party in the home of Professor Bergholz, Annemarie meets Rudolf Hartenstein again, as well as his sister Ola.
In the course of time, Annemarie and Rudolf fall in love. Their declaration of love occurs in a dramatic incident:  in a foggy cave, the Nebelhöhle, where Annemarie almost collapses into a deep abyss, Rudolf holds her fast and saves her at the last moment. At the Ulmer Münster, he asks Annemarie to marry him, but she refuses because she has promised her father to be his assistant. In the summer semester Annemarie returns to Berlin to work in a clinic. Rudolf Hartenstein is also in Berlin and works as a doctor in the same hospital as Annemarie. He is Annemarie’s superior, and between the two there is tension. When they meet during a storm in the Charlottenburg Palace Park, Rudolf renews his declaration of love, and this time Annemarie gives in. The two marry just as Annemarie's brother Hans marries Rudolf's sister Ola.
In the first edition, there is an allusion to the lost World War I. From a train window, Annemarie sees the Burg Hohenzollern that "so proudly stands and suspects nothing of the sudden overthrow of the Hohenzollern dynasty."
Some editions contain an additional chapter: an epilogue describing Annemarie’s future. She has  become the mother of a daughter, Vronli.

Critical reception
"Lehrer’s translation, smooth-flowing and easily approachable, brings readers into this series of proto-Young Adult fiction set in the long-vanished world of a Germany before the horrors of World War II. The “Nesthäkchen” of these novels is the living embodiment of the purist, nationalistic sentimentality of that Germany. An effective translation of a series that gives eye-opening glimpses into the lives of the comfortable middle-class in Germany between the world wars." Kirkus Review

Author

Else Ury (November 1, 1877 in Berlin; January 13, 1943 in the Auschwitz concentration camp) was a German writer and children's book author. Her best-known character is the blonde doctor's daughter Annemarie Braun, whose life from childhood to old age is told in the ten volumes of the highly successful Nesthäkchen series. The books, the six-part TV series Nesthäkchen (1983), based on the first three volumes, as well as the new DVD edition (2005) caught the attention of millions of readers and viewers.

Genre
The Nesthäkchen books represent a German literary genre, the Backfischroman, a girls' novel that describes maturation and was intended for readers 12–16 years old. A Backfisch (“teenage girl”, literally “fish for frying”) is a young girl between fourteen and seventeen years of age. The Backfischroman was in fashion between 1850 and 1950. It dealt overwhelmingly with stereotypes, traditional social images of growing girls absorbing societal norms. The stories ended in marriage, with the heroine becoming a Hausfrau. Among the most successful Backfischroman authors, beside Else Ury, were Magda Trott, Emmy von Rhoden with her Der Trotzkopf and Henny Koch. Ury intended to end the Nesthäkchen series with volume 6, Nesthäkchen Flies From the Nest, describing Nesthäkchen's marriage. Meidingers Jugendschriften Verlag, her Berlin publisher, was inundated with a flood of letters from Ury's young fans, begging for more Nesthäkchen stories. After some hesitation, Ury wrote four more Nesthäkchen volumes, and included comments about her initial doubts in an epilogue to volume 7, Nesthäkchen and Her Chicks.

References

German children's literature
Fictional German people
German books
Child characters in literature
Children's fiction books
1921 children's books